The X-Corporation (X-Corp) is a fictional institution appearing in American comic books published by Marvel Comics, commonly in association with the X-Men comics. This organization was created to ensure the protection of mutant rights throughout the world due to the increasing number of mutants and widespread bigotry and hate crimes against them.

Fictional history
X-Corp was founded by Prof. Charles Xavier, the founder of the X-Men. Its purpose is to provide support for "civilian" mutant populations on a global scale in a world where the mutant population was outgrowing the reach of the X-Men. X-Corp offices are located in many major cities in every continent, and each office is managed by a former member of the X-Men or one of their satellite teams, such as Sunspot or Domino. The worldwide headquarters of the X-Corporation is the X-Mansion. X-Corp works with local governments, such as when they took in the superstrong twelve-year-old orphan Molly Hayes on behalf of the Social Services of Los Angeles.

It should not be confused with the X-Corps, a short-lived paramilitary team led by Banshee, which merged with the X-Corporation after its dissolution, most of its members transferring to the Paris branch.

In the wake of the Decimation of mutantkind, wherein 90-95% of the mutant population was rendered genetically and physically human and thus powerless, several bombings occurred at X-Corporation locales. For the safety of those operating the facilities, and to regroup all empowered members, Cyclops ordered the evacuation of all X-Corp offices and the organization appears to be dead. With the minimal mutant population and the strict government rules imposed on mutants, the organization would serve no purpose.

X-Corp (volume 1)

A business delegation representing the nation of Krakoa debuted as part of Reign of X in 2021. X-Corp will handle the mutantkind's business interests and has expanded into two branches:

 X-Corp Pharma: Research, development, and production of Krakoa's pharmaceuticals.
 X-Corp Telecom: Development of the Ionospheric Bandwidth Generator for faster communication. The mutant circuit of Vulcan, Bishop, Thunderbird and Sunspot activates the generator.

The Board of Director includes:

 Angel (Warren Worthington III) – Chairperson
 Penance (Monet St. Croix) – CXO
 Mastermind (Jason Wyngrade) – CXO
Selene – CXO
Trinary (Shilpa Khatri) – CXO

Other supporting members include Multiple Man, Jumbo Carnation and Wind Dancer (Sofia Mantega).

Collected Editions

Known Locations & Members

Alternate uses
In the Marvel Trading Card Game, X-Corp is the evil scientific corporation that is controlled by the Hobgoblin, from the Spider-Man series.

References

External links
Uncannyxmen.net feature on X-Corporation

Fictional organizations in Marvel Comics
X-Men
X-Men supporting characters